"Intervention" is a song by Canadian indie rock band Arcade Fire. It is the third single released from the band's second full-length album, Neon Bible. The single was released to digital retailers on December 28, 2006, and was released as a 7" vinyl in the UK under Rough Trade Records on May 21, 2007. In the US, it was released on July 10, 2007, under Merge Records. The B-side of the vinyl includes a cover of another song from Neon Bible, "Ocean of Noise", performed by Calexico.

Arcade Fire performed "Intervention" on Saturday Night Live on February 24, 2007. The song was covered by the operatic soprano Renée Fleming in her 2010 album Dark Hope. The song is also featured as the opening theme for the satirical YouTube livestream programs Jesus Chatline and Buddhism Hotline.

The song was listed at #271 on Pitchfork Media's "Top 500 songs of the 2000s".

Track listing
"Intervention" – 4:17
"Ocean of Noise" – 4:54 (performed by Calexico)

References

2006 singles
2007 singles
Arcade Fire songs
2006 songs
Rough Trade Records singles
Merge Records singles
Songs written by William Butler (musician)
Songs written by Win Butler
Songs written by Régine Chassagne
Songs written by Jeremy Gara
Songs written by Tim Kingsbury
Songs written by Richard Reed Parry